Dampierre is the name of several communes in France:

 Dampierre, Aube, in the Aube département (Champagne-Ardenne)
 Dampierre, Calvados, in the Calvados département (Lower Normandy)
 Dampierre, Haute-Marne, in the Haute-Marne département
 Dampierre, Jura, in the Jura département 
 Dampierre-en-Graçay, in the Cher département
 Dampierre-en-Yvelines, in the Yvelines département (Île-de-France)
 Dampierre-le-Château, in the Marnes département (Champagne-Ardenne)
 Dampierre-sur-Avre, in the Eure-et-Loir département
 Dampierre-sur-Boutonne, in the Charente-Maritime département

Other meanings:

 Auguste Marie Henri Picot de Dampierre (1756–1793), general of the French Revolution
 House of Dampierre, an important family during the Middle Ages
 Château de Dampierre, a castle in Dampierre-en-Yvelines
 Dampierre (Soulcalibur), a character in the Soul series of video games

See also
 Dompierre (disambiguation)
 Dampier
 Isaac ben Samuel of Dampierre